Urahari is a village and former Village Development Committee that is now part of Tulsipur Sub-Metropolitan City in Dang Deokhuri District in Lumbini Province of south-western Nepal. In 2014, Urahari VDC was annexed into Tulsipur. At the time of the 1991 Nepal census it had a population of 8,764 persons living in 1288 individual households.

Media 
To Promote local culture Urahari had one FM radio station Radio Saryu Ganga - 104 MHz.

References

External links
UN map of the municipalities of Dang Deokhuri District

Populated places in Dang District, Nepal